Vilobí may refer to:
Vilobí del Penedès, municipality in the comarca of Alt Penedès
Vilobí d'Onyar, municipality in the comarca of Selva